Nicolás Esteban Zambrano (born 15 July 1996), known as Nicolas Zambrano or Nick Zambrano, is a Chilean naturalized New Zealand footballer who plays as a forward.

Career
As a youth player, Zambrano was with Universidad de Chile until the under-12 level before moving to New Zealand along with his family.

In New Zealand, he began his career with Central United in 2014 at the Northern League. In another season with them, he coincided with his compatriot Ignacio Machuca.

In the New Zealand Football Championship, he played for Auckland City, Team Wellington, Eastern Suburbs and Waitakere United.

In 2022, he joined Auckland United in the National League.

Personal life
Zambrano moved to New Zealand at the age of twelve due to his parents' work.

Honours
Auckland City
 New Zealand Football Championship: 2013–14

Team Wellington
 New Zealand Football Championship: 2016–17

References

External links
 
 

1986 births
Living people
Footballers from Santiago
Chilean footballers
Chilean expatriate footballers
Central United F.C. players
Auckland City FC players
Team Wellington players
Eastern Suburbs AFC players
Waitakere United players
Auckland United FC players
New Zealand Football Championship players
New Zealand National League players
Chilean expatriate sportspeople in New Zealand
Expatriate association footballers in New Zealand
Association football forwards